Tent of Miracles may refer to:
 Tent of Miracles (album), by the band Spirit
 Tent of Miracles (novel), by Jorge Amado